Urmila is a princess featured in the Ramayana. She is the younger sister of Sita, and the wife of Lakshmana, the younger brother of Rama.

Legend 
Urmila is the daughter of King Janaka of Mithila and Queen Sunayana, and the younger sister of Sita. She was married to King Dasharatha's third son, Lakshmana. They had two sons - Angada and Chandraketu. She is described as being as dedicated to Sita as Lakshmana was to Rama. According to some folklore, it is said that she also bore a daughter called Somada. 

When Lakshmana joined Rama and Sita in their exile, Urmila was ready to accompany him, but he hesitated and asked her to stay back in Ayodhya to take care of his aging parents. According to a legend, Urmila slept continuously for fourteen years. It is believed that during these fourteen years of exile, her husband also never slept to protect his brother and sister-in-law. On the first night of exile, when Rama and Sita were sleeping, the deity Nidra appeared to Lakshmana, and he requested her to offer him the boon of not requiring sleep. The goddess asked him that she could grant his wish, but someone else would have to take his place asleep. Lakshmana wondered if his wife could sleep instead of him. After hearing this, Nidra enquired Urmila regarding this, and the latter happily accepted the task. Urmila is notable for this unparalleled sacrifice, which is called Urmila Nidra.

According to another legend, it is said that when Lakshmana came to inform Urmila of his decision to join Rama in his exile, she was dressed as a queen. Lakshmana grew angry with her and compared her with Kaikeyi. This is stated to be a deliberate act of provocation to alleviate Lakshmana's guilt of leaving her behind so that he could take care of her brother and sister-in-law. When Sita learned of this, she remarked that hundreds of her would not be able to match Urmila's sacrifice.

Worship 
In Bharatpur district of Rajasthan, there is a temple dedicated to Lakshman and Urmila. The temple was built in 1870 AD by the then ruler Balwant Singh of Bharatpur and is considered as a royal temple by the royal family of Bharatpur State.

References 

 Urmila, the sleeping princess - The New Indian Express
 Lakshman's wife goes to sleep - Devlok

Further reading 
 Valmiki Ramayana, English verse translation by Desiraju Hanumanta Rao, K. M. K. Murthy et al.
 Ramayana, English verse translation by Ralph T. H. Griffith at the Project Gutenberg
 The Song of Urmila’s Separation: Andhra Women’s Song Spotlights Ramayana’s Neglected Urmila

Solar dynasty
Characters in the Ramayana